Chertkovsky (masculine), Chertkovskaya (feminine), or Chertkovskoye (neuter) may refer to:
Chertkovsky District, a district of Rostov Oblast, Russia
Chertkovskaya, a rural locality (a stanitsa) in Rostov Oblast, Russia